Time Share is a television film directed by Sharon von Wietersheim and starring Nastassja Kinski and Timothy Dalton. It premiered on Fox Family Channel on June 18, 2000.

Two single parents, male and female, along with their kids, have to involuntarily share a house for their holidays. The film was a hit when first aired on the then-Fox Family Channel (now Freeform), and was subsequently dubbed internationally. It is available in Region 2 German.

Cast
Nastassja Kinski as Dr. Julia Weiland
Timothy Dalton as Matthew 'Matt' Farragher
Kevin Zegers as Thomas Weiland
Cameron Finley as Max Weiland
Billy Kay as Lewis Farragher
Natalie Elizabeth Marston as Daphne Farragher
Carlton Gebbia as Felice Templeton
Geoffrey Lower as Russell
Kelli Garner as Kelly the Beach Girl
Randolph Mantooth as Ken Crandall
John Hostetter as Sam

Release

 Also known as
 2 i én (Denmark)
 Bitter Suite (UK)
 Como Água e Vinho (Brazil) / (TV title)
 Encontro às Avessas (Brazil)
 Juntos, pero no revueltos (Spain)
 Se cucini, ti sposo (Italy)
 Time Share (Germany) / (DVD title)
 Time Share – Doppelpack im Ferienhaus (Germany) / (TV title)
 Timeshare (Germany)
 Vacances sucrées-salées (Canada) / (French title)
 Таймшер (Russia)

External links 
 
 

2000 films
2000 television films
German television films
English-language German films
2000 romantic comedy films
ABC Family original films
Films set in the United States
American romantic comedy films
German romantic comedy films
2000s American films
2000s German films
Sat.1 original programming